Randall James "Randy" Moffitt (born October 13, 1948) is an American athlete. He was a baseball pitcher for the San Francisco Giants, Houston Astros and Toronto Blue Jays. Born in Long Beach, California, he is the younger brother of tennis star Billie Jean Moffitt King.

Career
Moffitt was drafted by the Giants in the 1st round (18th pick) of the 1970 amateur draft.  After a successful year as a starting pitcher for the Class-A Fresno Giants (9–6, 1.60) he was converted to relief with the Triple-A Phoenix Giants in 1971. He was called up to the big club in 1972, making his Major League Baseball debut on June 11.

In 1979, during his eighth year with the Giants, Moffitt contracted Cryptosporidia enteritis. By the end of the season, he was easily exhausted, vomiting frequently and lost around 25 pounds. His physicians were unable to determine what was causing his illness, with one suggesting that his problem was mental. Following a bloody stool incident during a plane trip in 1980, Moffitt had a colonoscopy done and a biopsy of a bleeding ulcer revealed the presence of Cryptosporidium parasites. According to a Sports Illustrated article, "it's reasonable to assume he caught it from a horse—although nobody knows how." Moffitt's recovery was slow and he was released from the Giants on August 4, 1981.

He was a dependable relief pitcher for many years, and finished in the National League Top Ten four times for saves and three times for games pitched.  During the 1970s he partnered first with Elías Sosa and later with Gary Lavelle to give the Giants one of the league's better bullpens.  In 534 career pitching appearances (all but one in relief) he finished 306 games including 96 saves.

References

External links
 or Retrosheet
1980 Baseball Register published by The Sporting News

1948 births
Living people
American expatriate baseball players in Canada
Baseball players from Long Beach, California
Fresno Giants players
Houston Astros players
Long Beach State Dirtbags baseball players
Major League Baseball pitchers
Phoenix Giants players
San Francisco Giants players
Toronto Blue Jays players
Tucson Toros players
Vancouver Canadians players
Long Beach Polytechnic High School alumni